Ammotrechelis is a monotypic genus of daesiid camel spiders, first described by Carl Friedrich Roewer in 1934. Its single species, Ammotrechelis goetschi is distributed in Chile.

References 

Solifugae
Arachnid genera
Monotypic arachnid genera